is a railway station on the Tobu Skytree Line in Sumida, Tokyo, Japan, operated by Tobu Railway.

Lines
The station is served by the Tobu Skytree Line from Asakusa Station in Tokyo to Tōbu-Dōbutsu-Kōen in Saitama Prefecture. It is located 3.2 km from Asakusa Station.

Station layout
Higashi-Mukōjima Station has two opposite side platforms serving two tracks.

Platforms

History
On 12 December 1987, the station was renamed Higashi-Mukōjima Station.

Surrounding area

 Tobu Museum, located beneath the elevated station and tracks, with viewing windows located beneath the platforms
 Mukōjima Hyakkaen, flower garden dating from the Edo period
 Tokyo Metropolitan Sumidagawa High School
 Route 6 (Mito Kaidō)
 Meiji Dōri

References

External links

Higashi-Mukōjima Station information 

Railway stations in Japan opened in 1902
Tobu Skytree Line
Stations of Tobu Railway
Railway stations in Tokyo